The Huon bowerbird (Amblyornis germanus) is a species of bowerbird which can be found on the Huon peninsula in northeastern New Guinea.

References

 Gill F, D Donsker & P Rasmussen  (Eds). 2022. IOC World Bird List (v12.1). doi :  10.14344/IOC.ML.12.1

Huon bowerbird
Birds of the Huon Peninsula
Huon bowerbird
Taxa named by Walter Rothschild